Union Sportive Koumassi is an Ivorian football club based in Abidjan.

History
The club was founded in 1999. Being a member of the Ivorian Football Federation Côte d'Ivoire Ligue 2 since 2008, their best result was a first place in 2015.

Current squad
As of January 2019

References

Association football clubs established in 1999
Football clubs in Abidjan
1999 establishments in Ivory Coast